Jiong was the twelfth king of the semi-legendary Xia Dynasty.

Family 
Jiōng was a son of Xie of Xia and his spouse and thus a grandson of Máng and brother of Bu Jiang.

His own consort is unknown. His son was Jǐn and his nephew was Kong Jia.

Biography 
According to the Bamboo Annals, Jiōng ruled about 18 years, while according to the Records of the Grand Historian, he ruled about 21 years.

He acceded to the throne in the Wuxu (戊戌) year.

In the 10th year of Jiōng's reign, Bu Jiang died.

Sources 

Xia dynasty kings